The discography of God Lives Underwater, a Pennsylvanian band, consists of three studio albums, one extended play, and seven singles.

Studio albums

Extended plays

Singles

References

External links 
 
God Lives Underwater charts and discography
God Lives Underwater discography

Discographies
Discographies of American artists